McCarthy Tétrault LLP is a leading Canadian law firm that delivers integrated business law, litigation services, tax law, real property law, labour and employment law nationally and globally through offices in Vancouver, Calgary, Toronto, Montréal, Québec City, London (UK), as well as New York City. McCarthy Tétrault LLP is one of the Seven Sisters law firms. Among the Seven Sisters, the reigning top firms are McCarthy Tetrault LLP, Stikeman Elliott LLP, Osler, Hoskin & Harcourt LLP, and Blake Cassels & Graydon LLP.

McCarthy Tétrault is the only law firm listed in the Report on Business Top 25 Best B2B Brands by The Globe and Mail in 2021, and it has the second strongest law firm brand in Canada according to Thomson Reuters’ Regional Law Firm Brand Indexes 2021.

The firm represents Canadian and international clients, including major public institutions, financial services organizations, mining companies, manufacturers, pharmaceutical companies and other corporations.

McCarthy Tétrault's London office specializes in assisting clients with their transatlantic transactions, and is staffed with both English and Canadian-qualified lawyers. A charter member of the Canada-UK Chamber of Commerce, it provides services in Europe, Africa and the Middle East.

History
The firm had its origin in the formation of Boulton & McCarthy in Barrie, Ontario, of which Dalton McCarthy was a co-founder. It would later become McCarthy & McCarthy upon the admission of his son Leighton McCarthy.

McCarthy Tétrault was created through the merger McCarthy & McCarthy of Toronto, Clarkson Tétrault of Montreal, Shrum Liddle & Hebenton of Vancouver, and Black & Company of Calgary. This merger was initially denied by the Law Society of Alberta, which enacted rules designed to stop it. The rules prohibited members from entering into a partnership with anyone who was not a resident of Alberta, and prohibited members from being partners of more than one firm. This rule was challenged as being contrary to the mobility rights protected by the Charter of Rights and Freedoms. In the resulting court case, Black v. Law Society of Alberta, the Supreme Court of Canada struck down the rules. The subsequent merger made McCarthy Tétrault Canada's first national law firm.

Notable alumni
 Dalton McCarthy
 Salter Hayden
 John J. Robinette
 Ian Binnie
Hubert Lacroix
 John Manley
 Marc-André Blanchard

References

External links
 Black v. Law Society of Alberta

Law firms of Canada
Law firms established in 1855
1855 establishments in Canada